Showkatiyeh (also Romanized as Showkatīyeh) is a village in Pain Velayat Rural District, in the Central District of Kashmar County, Razavi Khorasan Province, Iran. At the 2006 census, its population was 38, in 11 families.

References 

Populated places in Kashmar County